Live at First Avenue is a live album by Minnesota-based bluegrass group Trampled by Turtles, released on November 12, 2014. It was recorded at the Minneapolis nightclub First Avenue in April 2013 to celebrate the band's 10th anniversary.

Track listing

References

2013 albums
BanjoDad Records albums